Cotes Grassland is a  biological Site of Special Scientific Interest in Cotes in Leicestershire.

This meadow on the bank of the River Soar has a thin soil on alluvial river gravels. It has several plants which are uncommon in the Midlands, such as soft trefoil, spotted medick, knotted hedge-parsley, wild clary and subterranean trefoil.

There is access by a public footpath which crosses the site.

References

Sites of Special Scientific Interest in Leicestershire